Paul Joseph O'Shaughnessy (born 3 October 1981) in Bury, England, is an English professional footballer, who played as a midfielder for Bury. Moving  to Sydney, Australia he played for  North Sydney and Dunbar Rovers.

On 13 August 2019, O'Shaughnessy and his brothers Lee and Luke, witnessed and filmed a man wielding a knife who had just stabbed a woman in the 2019 Sydney stabbing attack.

Career 
He played as a midfielder for Bury in the Football League.
In 2009, O'Shaughnessy signed for Australian outfit North Sydney, before moving to play for Dunbar Rovers.

Notes

External links

1981 births
Living people
Footballers from Bury, Greater Manchester
English footballers
Association football midfielders
Bury F.C. players
Expatriate soccer players in Australia
Radcliffe F.C. players
English expatriate sportspeople in Australia
English Football League players
English expatriate footballers